Logan's Run is a short-lived American science fiction television series, a spin-off from the 1976 film of the same name. The series starred Gregory Harrison as Logan 5 (the title character), Heather Menzies as Jessica 6, and Randy Powell as Francis 7. This series was aired on CBS from September 16, 1977, to February 6, 1978.

The series maintains the basic premise and visual style of the film in that Logan and Jessica have escaped from the "City of Domes" so that they will not have to die upon reaching the age of 30. The series differs from the plot of the movie in various ways, and depicts Logan and Jessica on the run in each episode in various locations on future Earth as they search for the mythical place known as "Sanctuary". Logan and Jessica are also assisted in each episode by an android called Rem (Donald Moffat) who did not appear in the film version.

The series lasted only 14 episodes before it was cancelled due to its low rating. Three additional episodes were filmed but never aired.

Plot
The series depicted Logan and Jessica escaping from the City of Domes only to be pursued by Francis (Randolph Powell) and various other Sandmen. Traveling in a futuristic hovercraft-like vehicle which they find in an abandoned building in the remains of Washington DC, they embark on a trek through post-apocalyptic United States to find Sanctuary. On their journey, they encounter strange human societies, robots and aliens. The domed city (including Carousel) was seen only in the pilot and two other episodes, using recycled footage from the film. In a change from the book and film, the television series had the city secretly run by a cabal of older citizens who promised Francis a life beyond the age of 30 as a city elder if he can capture the fugitives. Logan and Jessica were joined on their journey by an android named Rem (played by Donald Moffat), whom they encounter in a futuristic city run by robots.

Cast
Gregory Harrison as Logan 5
Heather Menzies as Jessica 6
Donald Moffat as Rem
Randy Powell as Francis 7 (only appears in six of the fourteen episodes all the main cast members were credited with)

Production

Writing
D. C. Fontana served as story editor and worked alongside several other writers from Star Trek as well as one of the original novel's authors. Executive producers were Ivan Goff and Ben Roberts, who had created Charlie's Angels the year before.

The pilot episode, which began with a condensed retelling of the original film's concept was written by William F. Nolan, co-author of the original novel, with Saul David, the original producer of the film and the TV series (until he was dismissed), and series producer Leonard Katzman. When the pilot was presented to the network, CBS asked to have part of the pilot re-shot with changes to the plot, including the introduction of a cabal of city elders who secretly ruled over the Domed city. This change alters Francis 7's motivations for pursuing Logan. In the film, his intent is to kill Logan for betrayal, but due to the introduction of the cabal, Francis is offered by them the chance to live beyond age 30 as a reward for bringing Logan and Jessica back to the city.

Goff and Roberts were brought on board by MGM when original producer of the TV show (and producer of the film) Saul David was fired from the project and the pilot episode went through reshoots, rewriting and re-editing prior to being green-lit for production as a series. The line producer for the series was Leonard Katzman.

Fontana commissioned Harlan Ellison to write a treatment for one episode ("Crypt" which was heavily revised) and David Gerrold to write a teleplay ("Man Out of Time"). Gerrold's script was rewritten by someone else, prompting Gerrold to use his pen name "Noah Ward" (a homonym of "no award") on the episode.

Casting
In a 2017 interview, Heather Menzies stated that Dirk Benedict and her Sound of Music co-star Nicholas Hammond also auditioned for the role of Logan 5. When asked for her opinion on the series' quick demise, she replied: "I think they needed to spend more money on the visuals. Star Wars came out around that time and we couldn't really compete with that".

Music
The series' main theme tune was composed by Laurence Rosenthal.

Episodes

Cancellation
Despite its brief run, the show was sold overseas. It was shown in the United Kingdom by the ITV network in early 1978, though times varied per region. It was also shown in Australia late 1977. It was also broadcast on Channel One in New Zealand.

The Mego Corporation had planned to release a line of Logan's Run toys in conjunction with the series. Prototypes were made for several 10" action figures, but the cancellation of the show prompted Mego to change their minds and cancel production.

Home media
The complete run of the series was released by Warner Home Video on Region 1 DVD on April 10, 2012.

References

External links

1977 American television series debuts
1978 American television series endings
1970s American science fiction television series
Television series set in the 24th century
Ageism in fiction
Androids in television
English-language television shows
CBS original programming
Live action television shows based on films
Television series by MGM Television
Television series based on adaptations
Television series by Warner Bros. Television Studios
Post-apocalyptic television series
Television shows set in New Jersey